Aulacodes purpurealis is a species of moth of the family Crambidae. It was described by George Hamilton Kenrick in 1907 and is found in Papua New Guinea.

It has a wingspan of 25 mm.

References

Acentropinae
Moths of New Guinea